Anne Marie Spalding Comi is an American pediatric neurologist specialized in the treatment of Sturge–Weber syndrome. She is a professor of neurology and pediatrics at the Johns Hopkins School of Medicine and director of the Hunter Nelson Sturge-Weber Center at the Kennedy Krieger Institute.

Life 
Comi graduated from College of the Holy Cross in 1989 and was inducted into Phi Beta Kappa. She earned a M.D. at the University of Buffalo School of Medicine in 1993. She completed a residency in neurology at the Women & Children's Hospital of Buffalo in 1996 and the Johns Hopkins School of Medicine in 1999. She specializes in the treatment of Sturge–Weber syndrome and disorders due to vascular malformation.

Comi has served as the director of the Hunter Nelson Sturge-Weber Center at the Kennedy Krieger Institute since 2002. She is a professor of neurology and pediatrics at the Johns Hopkins School of Medicine.

References 

Living people
Place of birth missing (living people)
Year of birth missing (living people)
College of the Holy Cross alumni
University at Buffalo alumni
Johns Hopkins School of Medicine faculty
Physician-scientists
American medical researchers
Women medical researchers
American pediatricians
Women pediatricians
Pediatric neurologists
American neurologists
American women neuroscientists
Women neurologists
21st-century American women physicians
21st-century American physicians